Stony Brook University (SBU or SUNY Stony Brook), officially the State University of New York at Stony Brook, is a public research university in Stony Brook, New York. Along with the University at Buffalo, it is one of the State University of New York system's two flagship institutions.

Opened  in  1957 in Oyster Bay as the State University College on Long Island, the institution moved to Stony Brook in 1962. In 2001, Stony Brook was elected to the Association of American Universities, a selective group of major research universities in North America. It is also a member of the larger Universities Research Association. It is classified among "R1: Doctoral Universities – Very high research activity".

Stony Brook University, in partnership with Battelle, manages Brookhaven National Laboratory, a national laboratory of the United States Department of Energy. The university acquired land for a Research & Development Park adjacent to its main campus in 2004, and has four business incubators across the region. The University's impact on the Long Island economy amounts to US$7.23 billion in increased output, and research expenditures have surpassed the US$230 million mark annually. Stony Brook is the largest single-site employer on Long Island; over 25,500 students are enrolled at the university, which has over 15,000 employees and over 2,850 faculty.

As of May 2022, Stony Brook faculty and alumni have included: 7 Nobel laureates, 2 Abel Prize recipients, at least 5 living billionaires, 2 Pulitzer Prize winners, and 5 Fields Medalists, putting it in a tie for the seventh-most among American universities.

Stony Brook's intercollegiate athletic teams have competed in Division I of the NCAA since 1999 as the Seawolves. Stony Brook joined the Colonial Athletic Association on July 1, 2022 after competing as a member of the America East Conference since 2001.

History

Origins in Oyster Bay

The State University of New York at Stony Brook was established in Oyster Bay in 1957, as the State University College on Long Island (SUCOLI). Established almost a decade after the creation of New York's public higher education system, the institution was envisioned as a college for the preparation of secondary school teachers.

Leonard K. Olson was appointed as the first dean of the institution and was instrumental in the recruitment of faculty staff and planning of the later Stony Brook campus. SUCOLI opened with an inaugural class of 148 students, on the grounds of the William Robertson Coe Planting Fields estate. These first students were admitted on a tuition-free basis.

1961 was a year of firsts as thirty students were conferred degrees in the first commencement and the university was appointed its first president, John Francis Lee. Lee left later that year due to political and bureaucratic matters regarding the future of the university and the central administration at Albany. Nevertheless, he had fulfilled his primary task of reshaping the university from a technical science and engineering college of limited degree options to a full-scale university featuring liberal arts programs.

Move to Stony Brook
In 1960 the Heald Report, commissioned by Governor Nelson Rockefeller, recommended a major new public university be built on Long Island to "stand with the finest in the country", a report that would ultimately shape most of the university's growth for years to come.

However, the longer name has fallen out of favor; since 2005, it has usually been called simply Stony Brook University (SBU).

The campus had 782 students enrolled in 1962, but enrollment had increased more than tenfold by 1969, surpassing the 8,000 mark, fueled by the large funding of public higher education in the Sputnik era. In 1963, only three years after the release of the Heald Report, the Governor commissioned the "Education of Health Professions" (Muir Report) report. The report outlined the need for expansion of the university system to prepare medical professionals for the future needs of the state. The report was particularly important for Stony Brook as it recommended creation of a Health Science Center and academic hospital at the campus to serve the need of the fastest-growing counties (Nassau and Suffolk) in New York at the time.

Growth
In 1965, the State University appointed John S. Toll, a physicist from the University of Maryland as the second president of Stony Brook. In 1966, the university set forth initial timetables for the development of the Health Science Center, which would house the university's health programs and hospital. Despite the budgetary concerns and challenges from Albany, the university released a formalized plan early in 1968 and funding for recruitment of faculty was provided. At the same time, residential housing was expanded to 3,000, the Stony Brook Union opened in 1970, and in 1971, the massive expansion project for the campus library (named in memory of Frank Melville Jr., father of philanthropist Ward Melville) was completed.

Despite the fast-paced growth, campus infrastructure often struggled to keep pace: overcrowding, expansion, landscaping, lighting, and safety were persistent problems at the university, which led to multiple protests and growing tension between the student body and the administration. In January 1968, the infamous "Operation Stony Brook" drug raid resulted in the arrest of twenty nine students and in the fall of 1968, tension climaxed as the administration and students decided on a three-day moratorium to bring together the entire university with the goal of improving communication between the students, faculty, and administration.

The 1970s witnessed the growth of the university and its transformation as a major research institution within New York's public school system, with strong graduate programs and scientific breakthroughs like the development of magnetic resonance imaging. But the university lagged significantly in undergraduate education, prioritizing graduate education and research over undergraduate studies and student life. By 1975, enrollment had reached 16,000 and expansion crossed over Nicolls Road with the construction of the Health Science Center, which would be completed in 1980.

In 1981, John Marburger was inaugurated as the third president, and continued the expansion. By the late 1980s, the administration affirmed the need to improve other areas of the institution, which included undergraduate education, student and residential life, and intercollegiate athletics. In 1994, the university approved a decision to transition athletics to the Division I of the NCAA by 1999 and followed with the construction of the Stony Brook Arena and the expansion of the Indoor Sports Complex.

Further expansion into the 21st century
The 1990s affirmed Stony Brook's success at building a research university with a strong undergraduate education. Under the leadership of its fourth president, Shirley Strum Kenny, the administration sought out to showcase the value of the institution. Kenny was responsible for campus wide improvement projects which included large scale landscaping, renovations of every residence hall, the continued growth of the athletics programs, the improvement of student life, ever increasing research expenditures, a branding/marketing campaign, and the university's increasing ties with private philanthropy.

In the mid-1990s, the school began to distance itself from the SUNY system, as Kenny believed that the SUNY name was hurting the school's reputation.

In 1998, the university became one of the top 100 of American research universities in the U.S. News & World Report. That same year, the university and Battelle Memorial Institute were chosen by the Department of Energy as joint operators of the Brookhaven National Laboratory, joining a selective group of universities that operated national laboratories across the nation. Enrollment reached the 20,000 mark in 2001, and the administration's improvement efforts climaxed with the invitation to the highly selective Association of American Universities, an organization of North American universities committed to a strong system of research and education.

2002 saw the opening of the $22 million Kenneth P. LaValle Stadium and the inauguration of the massive Charles B. Wang Center dedicated to Asian and American culture, funded by a $50 million donation from Charles B. Wang. At the time, it was the largest private donation to a SUNY institution. In 2003, chemistry professor Paul Lauterbur received a Nobel Prize in Physiology or Medicine for his research and discovery of Nuclear Magnetic Resonance, which was instrumental in the development of NMR Imaging (MRI) while at Stony Brook. In 2005, the university bought the Flowerfield property adjacent to campus through eminent domain as land for the development of a Research and Development Park. Plans for a law school were in the talks but scrapped shortly after.

In 2009, president Shirley Strum Kenny stepped down, and in May, Samuel L. Stanley was announced as Stony Brook's fifth president. The late 2000s saw the university receive historic philanthropic donations. Hedge funder Jim Simons made multiple multi-million donations, including a $25 million donation to the Stony Brook Foundation in 2006, a $60 million donation for the development of the Simons Center for Geometry and Physics in 2008, and a landmark $150 million donation to the university in 2011. Other major donations were provided by alumni Joe Nathan, Stuart Goldstein, and Glenn Dubin for major renovation of athletic facilities. In 2010, Stanley announced Project 50 Forward, a comprehensive plan for the development of the university in the next fifty years with a focus on "operational excellence, academic greatness, and building for the future."

In 2012, the $40 million Walter J. Hawrys Campus Recreation Center opened, soon followed by the on-campus Hilton Garden Inn in May 2013. Frey Hall, named after alumnus Robert Frey, opened in 2013 after undergoing renovations as the former Old Chemistry building. The Stony Brook University Arena underwent a $21 million overhaul, re-opening as the Island Federal Arena in 2014. In July 2015, a new $40.8 million Computer Science building opened, spanning . New dormitories, known as Chavez Hall and Tubman Hall, along with a new East Side Dining hall, opened in the fall of 2016. In January 2019, Stony Brook Medicine opened their $194 million cancer center to the public.

President Stanley left Stony Brook effective August 1, 2019 to become the president of Michigan State University following the Larry Nassar scandal. Provost Michael A. Bernstein was named interim president in his place. On March 26, 2020, Maurie McInnis, the executive vice president and provost of the University of Texas was named the sixth president of Stony Brook, effective July 1, 2020.

During the COVID-19 pandemic, the United States Army constructed $50 million temporary field hospitals on the campus of Stony Brook University. However, the beds were dismantled in 2021 without ever being used. A $63.4 million renovation of the Stony Brook Union was completed during the pandemic and opened in 2020.

Flagship status era 
On January 5, 2022, New York governor Kathy Hochul officially designated Stony Brook University and the University at Buffalo as the two flagship universities of the State University of New York system. The announcement came with the dedication of a new $100 million multidisciplinary engineering building. On January 25, 2022, Stony Brook announced its departure from the America East Conference after 21 years to the Colonial Athletic Association, effective July 1, 2022.

Distinguished professor Dennis Sullivan earned the 2022 Abel Prize, the top honor in mathematics.

In the 2022–23 edition of the U.S. News & World Report national college rankings, Stony Brook was ranked 77th, its highest-ever placement as well as the first time that Stony Brook held sole possession of the highest-ranked public university in New York.

Campus

Main campus

Bounded to the north by New York State Route 25A (North Country Road) the campus is subdivided into "West Campus" and "East Campus" by the thoroughfare County Road 97 (Nicolls Road). The Ashley Schiff Forest Preserve separates the South Campus from West Campus. The Long Island Rail Road serves the community with the Stony Brook station situated along the northern edge of the campus.

West

The west campus is the center of the academic life of the university. It houses the majority of academic, athletic, and undergraduate student housing facilities while also being the original site of the university.

The modern campus is centered around the Academic Mall, which stretches for more than a quarter of a mile from the Simons Center for Geometry and Physics at the west end to the Administration Building at the east end. The Academic Mall includes the Student Activities Center, Frank Melville Jr. Memorial Library, Staller Center for the Arts, Humanities building, Psychology A & B, Harriman Hall, Frey Hall (previously known as Old Chemistry), the Earth and Space Sciences Building, Math Tower, and Physics building.

The Engineering Quad is located near the Academic Mall, and contains the Engineering, Light Engineering, Heavy Engineering, and Computing Center facilities. The Javits Lecture Center, Social and Behavioral Sciences Building, Computer Science building, New Computer Science building and Student Union facilities are also on the west campus. The Life Sciences complex, also on the west campus, consists of the Life Sciences Building, Laufer Center for Physical and Quantitative Biology, Centers for Molecular Medicine, Bioengineering building, and the Institute for Advanced Computational Science.

Among the latest additions to the campus are the Simons Center for Geometry and Physics, the new Walter J. Hawrys Campus Recreation Center, the Hilton Garden Inn hotel, Frey Hall, and a new Computer Science building. The Staller Center, which contains the largest movie screen in Long Island's Suffolk County, holds the annual Stony Brook Film Festival.

The athletic facilities are in the northwest quadrant of west campus, which include the Stony Brook Sports Complex, Island Federal Credit Union Arena, Kenneth P. LaValle Stadium, Joe Nathan Field, University Track, and University Field.

South
The South Campus is about half a mile south of the Academic Mall and separated from West Campus by the Ashley Schiff Forest Preserve. It is home to the School of Dental Medicine, the School of Marine and Atmospheric Sciences (SoMAS), the Cody Center for Autism and Developmental Disabilities, and the University Police headquarters.

Research and development
The Research and Development Park is on Stony Brook Road, a mile from the center of campus. On November 3, 2005, the university announced it had formally acquired  of the adjacent Flowerfield property, originally owned by the St. James Gyrodyne Company of America, through eminent domain, three years after the university had expressed its desire to acquire the property.

Stony Brook is using this property as a Research and Development Park, similar to other university-affiliated science parks around the country. The campus will ultimately house ten new buildings. The first building, the Center of Excellence in Wireless and Information Technology (CEWIT), was completed in October 2008. CEWIT houses the world's first (and currently the largest) immersive gigapixel facility in the world, called the Reality Deck. In 2019, Stony Brook University celebrated the opening of its astonishing new SMART Cluster in CEWIT, a dual use GPU Cluster for both machine learning and visualization. The SMART Cluster is also the first hardware-accelerated ray-tracing cluster for real-time cinematic quality rendering, allowing scientists, engineers and physicians to visualize huge amounts of data in a new way.. Construction for the Advanced Energy Research and Technology Center, designed by Flad Architects, commenced in the Summer of 2008 and is open as of spring 2010.

East

The East Campus is separated from the main campus by Nicolls Road (County Road 97). It is home to the Stony Brook University Hospital and the Health Sciences Center. Stony Brook University Hospital, completed in 1980, is Suffolk County's only tertiary hospital and Level 1 Trauma Center, and the only academic medical center in Suffolk County—larger also than any in Nassau County.
The hospital is the largest in Suffolk County, and the attached Health Sciences Center (HSC) and Basic Science Tower (BST) houses numerous laboratories, the School of Medicine (1972), the School of Nursing (1970), the School of Health Professions (1970) and the School of Social Welfare (1971). The area also includes the Ambulatory Surgery Center and the Center for Outpatient Services.

Construction on the Medical and Research Translation (MART) building began in November 2013, and the 240,000 square foot building opened on November 1, 2018, with its $194 million cost funded by state grants and donations from Jim Simons. The MART building is the home to the Stony Brook Cancer Center. In November 2019, Stony Brook Medicine opened a four-story, $73 million expansion to the Stony Brook Children's Hospital.

Also in the east side of campus are the Chapin apartments, which provide housing for graduate students. The Long Island High Technology Incubator, one of the four business incubators of the university, is a short walk north of the hospital. The Long Island State Veterans Home serving the Long Island veteran community is in this part of campus.

Manhattan Campus

In 2002, the university established a presence in Manhattan with the opening of Stony Brook Manhattan. The original site was at 401 Park Avenue South; a newer operation opened in late 2008 in the adjacent building on the third floor of 387 Park Avenue South. The university consolidated operations in 2011 to just the 3rd floor of 387 Park Avenue South, with a classroom entrance around the corner at 101 East 27th Street. The  site allows Stony Brook to offer professional and graduate courses targeted towards students in New York City; undergraduate courses are held primarily during the summer and winter sessions. Conferences and special events take place throughout the year. In February 2017 however, the lease for this campus was terminated, and there are no classes offered at this location.

Southampton Campus

On March 24, 2006, the university completed the purchase of the  Southampton College (on the east end of Long Island) property from Long Island University with the intent to develop it as a full college campus focusing on academic programs related to the environment and sustainability. Stony Brook expanded its original program, started in the fall of 2005, when it offered an undergraduate marine sciences program, with teaching and research facilities at the campus leased from Long Island University. An enrollment of about 2,000 students is expected within the next five years. Professor Martin Schoonen was appointed interim dean of Southampton campus on August 3, 2006, and conservationist Mary Pearl was appointed dean and vice president in March 2009.

On April 7, 2010, the university had suspended residential programs and transferred sustainability programs to the main campus. The change was prompted by severe state budget cuts. Although the Marine Sciences and Graduate Writing programs are still in session at Southampton, undergraduates were relocated to the main campus. As a result of the suspension of residential programs, all dining services and retail operations were suspended by the Faculty Student Association. The old LIU radio station and National Public Radio affiliate no longer operate on the campus.

In September 2011 Stony Brook Southampton began offering an undergraduate program called Semester by the Sea, where students attend undergraduate classes to study the Ocean or the Arts. Students studying the Ocean are immersed in marine topics that are enhanced with close proximity to the water, a fleet of research vessels and graduate research projects that are ongoing. Students studying the Arts are engaged in studies for filmmaking and creative writing. Both programs offer a Public Lecture Series.

As of 2015, the Stony Brook Southampton campus has shown growth, despite almost being closed down in 2010. Programs had been added back and the Board of Trustees of the State University of New York approved a long-awaited partnership agreement between Southampton and Stony Brook University hospitals. Enrollment increased to over 400, after being around 175, three years following the addition of new funding.

As of 2019, Stony Brook University operates the Stony Brook Southampton Hospital with plans to take ownership of more eastern Long Island hospitals.

South Korea
Stony Brook University has operations in Incheon, South Korea as part of the Incheon Global Campus (IGC). The other schools involved include George Mason University, the University of Utah, Ghent University and the Fashion Institute of Technology.

In July 2011, Stanley announced that the Ministry of Education, Science and Technology in South Korea has approved the establishment of SUNY Korea as part of Songdo International Business District in Incheon. The campus was expected to begin academic programs in March 2012 with an enrollment of 200. As of 2021, the student body contained roughly 1,000 students from over 40 countries. Its president is Arthur H. Lee, who was appointed to the role effective January 1, 2022. Stony Brook University students are allowed to apply for an exchange program at SUNY Korea, while SUNY Korea students are required to take a year of classes at Stony Brook University.

Beginning in 2017, FIT joined Stony Brook in offering degree programs at SUNY Korea.

Art on campus
Stony Brook University has four gallery spaces on campus. As was the desire of donor Paul W. Zuccaire, the Paul W. Zuccaire Gallery, formerly known as the University Art Gallery, showcases professional exhibitions as well as annual graduate and undergraduate student works. The Paul W. Zuccaire Gallery is in the Staller Center for the Arts.

Also on campus is the Latin American and Caribbean Studies Center's Art Gallery, which features works from Latino and Latin American artists as well as local artists who fall under that category. The SAC Art Gallery is a center for interactive and participatory art projects.

The Tabler Center for Arts, Culture, and Humanities includes an art gallery and blackbox theater performance space.

The Simons Center for Geometry and Physics includes an art gallery as well.

Organization and administration

The Stony Brook University consists of a main campus in Stony Brook, and additional satellite campuses in Southampton and South Korea. The university is composed of twelve schools and colleges. By enrollment, the largest college or school is the College of Arts and Science.

The university is governed by the State University of New York board of trustees, a body of eighteen members which regulate all the individual units of the SUNY system. The trustees have the authority to appoint the president of each state-operated institution, grant all degree diplomas and certificates for the completion of studies at any state-operated campus, and regulation of admissions, tuition, curricula, and all other matters pertaining to the operation and administration of each state-operated campus. The president of Stony Brook is the principal executive officer of the university. The position was first held by John Francis Lee and is held by the sixth president in the institution's history, Maurie McInnis, who took office on July 1, 2020.

Endowment
Stony Brook's financial endowment is managed by the Stony Brook Foundation. The foundation was established in 1965 as a not-for-profit corporation under the New York State Education Law. Chartered to collect and manage gifts from private and non-state resources to supplement the funding of the university and managed by a voluntary Board of Trustees. Donations can be made to a wide selection of funds which benefit different areas of the university. In 2012 the endowment was valued at approximately $125 million with total assets amounting to nearly $350 million and has fully recovered from the losses endured in the 2008 economic downturn. After a strong fundraising campaign led by Jim Simon's $150 million donation, the university amounted to more than $180 million in fundraising for the 2011-12 year and raised $200 million by March 2013. It is the second largest endowment among State University of New York university centers behind the University at Buffalo. However, the University's endowment remains far below the average of its Association of American Universities peers.

Student government

Housed in the Student Activity Center, the Undergraduate Student Government (USG) is the governing body representing the undergraduate students of the university. The main functions of USG involve regulation, funding, and recognizing official clubs and organizations of the university. Undergraduate students are obligated to pay a Student Activity Fee per semester which is then administered by the Undergraduate Student Government. USG manages the yearly Homecoming events, Roth Pond Regatta and the traditional end-of-the year Brookfest concert and a series of concerts and events branded as "Stony Brook Concerts" that occur throughout the academic year while also directly funding undergraduate organizations, clubs, and other student services. USG at Stony Brook has a long history going back to the founding of the Student Polity Association (Polity) in 1959. After the controversial de-certification of Polity by the administration in 2002, USG was founded in 2003.

Like USG, the Graduate Student Organization (GSO) is the governing body representing the graduate students of the university. The GSO advocates for graduate student interests to senior university administration, and is part of shared governance at the university. Graduate students pay a per-semester activity fee which is used to fund events and programs for the Graduate community. The GSO provides services for graduate students including funding for conferences, seminars, speaker events, travel to Brookhaven and Cold Spring Harbor Laboratories, funding for social events, departmental organizations, and student clubs. The GSO hosts social events, professional development programming, and free legal and tax clinics. Traditional events hosted by the GSO include graduate student orientation, Three Minute Thesis, an annual speaker event, and national conferences. The GSO co-manages the University Cafe. GSO executive board members partake in national advocacy, and work with organizations such as the National Association of Graduate-Professional Students (NAGPS) on advocating for higher education policy issues.

Academics 
Stony Brook was one of ten national universities awarded a National Science Foundation recognition award in 1998 for their integration of research and education. Between 2005 & 2007, two Nobel Prizes were awarded to professors for their work conducted at Stony Brook. The university has an annual $4.65 billion economic impact on the region. Stony Brook co-manages Brookhaven National Laboratory through Brookhaven Science Associates, a 50-50 partnership with Battelle Memorial Institute. Stony Brook is also one of two public schools in New York to have a medical school and a dental school, the other being University at Buffalo.

The university's health science and medical component, collectively referred to as Stony Brook Medicine, includes the Renaissance School of Medicine and the Schools of Dental Medicine, Nursing, Health Technology and Management, Pharmacy and Pharmaceutical Sciences, and Social Welfare, as well as the Hospital, major centers and institutes, programs, clinics and community-based healthcare settings, and the Long Island State Veterans Home.

Tuition
For the 2021–22 academic year, annual undergraduate tuition and fees was $10,410 for in-state students and $28,080 for out-of-state students. Tuition alone cost $7,070 and $24,740, respectively, with $3,020 in fees. Average room and board cost is $14,884.

78% of full-time enrolled freshmen received financial aid, with an average of $13,100 per student. 71% of full-time enrolled freshmen received a scholarship or aid from a federal or state government institution. 42% of full-time enrolled freshmen received loan aid from the federal government at an average of $5,000 per student.

Student body

In fall 2021, the university had an enrollment of 26,782 students: 18,010 undergraduate students and 8,772 graduate students.

Of all students, 23,072 (86 percent) are U.S. citizens or permanent residents representing all states of the United States and 3,536 (13 percent) are international students representing over a hundred countries around the world.

21,103 students hail from New York state, accounting for 79 percent of the student body. 12,061 students (45 percent) of the student body reside in Nassau or Suffolk County on Long Island, while 6,766 students (25 percent) reside in New York City.

2,276 students (8.5 percent) reside north of New York City, with Westchester County, Rockland County and Orange County as the three most common. 7.3 percent of students live out of state, most represented by New Jersey, California and Connecticut.

Half of Stony Brook's international students hail from China. An additional 18% come from India and 10% from South Korea. In 2021, there were more Asian American undergraduate students than White American students attending Stony Brook for the first time in the university's history.

Rankings

In 2022, U.S. News & World Report ranked Stony Brook University 77th overall among national universities and 31st among public universities. In the same year, the QS US University Rankings ranked Stony Brook University as No. 39 in the US. In the same year, Stony Brook University was ranked the top public university in New York.

In 2020, The Wall Street Journal ranked Stony Brook University tied with two others as the second-best public school in the Northeastern United States.

In 2015, Kiplinger's Personal Finance ranked Stony Brook 33rd best value among the country's public institutions for in-state students, and 26th for out-of-state students. In 2012, The Wall Street Journal ranked Stony Brook 8th among public universities sending students to elite graduate programs.

, U.S. News & World Report has given the following rankings to graduate programs at Stony Brook:
The School of Engineering is ranked 67th, the School of Social Work is ranked 71st, the School of Medicine is ranked 59th in Research and a 'Rank Not Published' in Primary Care nationally.
Nuclear Physics (categorized as a Physics specialty) ranked 4th; Geometry (categorized as a Mathematics specialty) ranked 4th; Clinical Psychology ranked 4th; Topology (categorized as a Mathematics specialty) ranked 11th; Physician Assistant program ranked 16th; Physics ranked 23rd; Midwifery ranked 23rd; Mathematics ranked 25th; Political Science ranked 29th; Earth Science ranked 34th; Materials Science (categorized as an Engineering specialty) ranked 37th; Psychology ranked 39th; Sociology ranked 40th; Computer Science ranked 40th; Occupational Therapy ranked 44th; Biological Sciences ranked 55th; Chemistry ranked 56th; English ranked 60th; Economics ranked 63rd; History ranked 63rd; Physical Therapy ranked 64th; and Fine Arts ranked 98th.

In 2017, the Shanghai Global Rankings of Academic Subjects ranked Stony Brook's Mathematics program 13th best worldwide.

College Factuals 2015 survey ranked Stony Brook University's Applied Mathematics program as 3rd best in the United States.

The Stony Brook College of Business earned AACSB International Accreditation in 2021.

Awards 
In 2021, a team of students of the Journalism School won the Edward R. Murrow Awards for Excellence in Audio Feature Reporting.

Research 
The School of Marine and Atmospheric Sciences (SoMAS) is the SUNY center for marine and atmospheric research, education, and public service. More than 300 graduate and undergraduate students from 16 different nations work and study at SoMAS. The School's students study coastal oceanographic processes and atmospheric sciences. The Marine Sciences Research Center, the original institute for marine studies, was incorporated into the new School of Marine and Atmospheric Sciences (SOMAS) on June 15, 2007.

The university co-manages Brookhaven National Laboratory, which is affiliated with the United States Department of Energy. In the Physical Sciences, Mathematics and Engineering area, some of the research centers of Stony Brook University are the Institute for Mathematical Sciences, the Institute for Advanced Computational Science, and the C. N. Yang Institute for Theoretical Physics among others. In the biomedical sciences, Stony Brook houses the Center for Biotechnology and the Institute of Chemical Biology and Drug Discovery, among many others. In March 2008, the university received $60 million endowment from James Simons to establish the Simons Center for Geometry and Physics. The Louis and Beatrice Laufer Center for Physical and Quantitative Biology was established by a generous gift in 2008 from Henry Laufer.

In July 2007 Stony Brook won a grant from the Department of Defense to devise ways to prevent terrorists from corrupting computers, and another from the Department of Homeland Security to design a system to detect radiation without triggering false alarms.

The New York Center for Computational Sciences (NYCCS), formed in 2007, is a joint venture of Stony Brook University and Brookhaven National Laboratory. Its centerpiece is an 18-rack Blue Gene /L and 2 rack Blue Gene/P massively parallel supercomputer
based on the IBM system-on-chip technology, also known as New York Blue Gene supercomputer. In the June 2008 Top 500 supercomputer rankings New York Blue Gene/L was ranked 17th, and Blue Gene/P was ranked 75th. The total peak performance for both Blue Gene/L and Blue Gene/P consists 103.22 teraflops (trillion floating-point calculations per second).

In 2016, Stony Brook University placed second at the Long Island regional round of the New York State Business Plan Competition. New York Institute of Technology placed first with four teams qualifying for the state competition's final round, while Stony Brook University had three teams qualifying for the state competition's final round.

Notable research and discoveries
There have been many notable research projects and important scientific discoveries at Stony Brook.

Admissions 
In 2018, Stony Brook University accepted 41.8%, or 15,800, of the 37,828 freshman applications it received.                                    
Of the 15,800 freshmen applicants accepted, 3,383 chose to enroll, or a rate of 21.4%.

Academic Profile of middle 50% of enrolled freshmen (as of 2018)
GPA: 91-97 (100-point scale), 3.6-4.0 (4-point scale)
 47% in top ten percent of graduating class
 80% in top quarter of graduating class
 97% in top half of graduating class
 SAT: 1250-1400
 SAT Math: 630-740
 SAT Evidence-Based Reading and Writing: 600-680
 ACT: 26-31

The average SAT score of 2018 freshmen is 1323 out of 1600.

Student life
Stony Brook has a wide variety of student-run organizations on campus, which include sororities and fraternities, and a count of almost 300 recognized student clubs and organizations. The Undergraduate Student Government at Stony Brook University is trusted with the responsibility of budgeting the undergraduate student activity fee which funds most student run organizations on campus. The Graduate Student Organization is responsible for budgeting the graduate student activity fee, and supplies a variety of funding opportunities, programming, student services, and funding for departmental and student organizations.

The oldest campus newspaper is The Statesman, which was founded in 1957 when the university was in Oyster Bay. Other publications include the Stony Brook Press, Stony Brook Independent, Blackworld, and the Asian American E-Zine. Stony Brook also has a campus-wide public radio station, WUSB, which serves most of Long Island and dedicates programming to Stony Brook athletics and other events on campus.

Once seen as a "suitcase school" of commuters, Stony Brook sought to increase the number of students living on campus, and now has the greatest number of all public schools in New York. Around 83% of freshmen students are on-campus residents. Other schools have since adopted similar practices to increase residential numbers.

Events and traditions

Incoming freshmen are welcomed to the university in August with First Night Out, a night of events taking place on the Friday in which they move in. Organized by Student Engagement and Activities, the night consists of a "Party on the Plaza" as well as various assorted activities. Wolfieland, an annual carnival, began in 2016 and takes place during September. Stony Brook University's annual Homecoming celebration, known as "Wolfstock", takes place in October and features numerous activities throughout the week, including Homecoming Hoopla & Carnival on Wednesday and the Seawolves Showcase talent show on Friday. Wolfstock culminates in Stony Brook's annual Homecoming football game on Saturday, which traditionally draws record-breaking crowds upwards of 12,000 people. The homecoming court is presented during halftime, dating back to 1984. Beginning in 2018, Stony Brook shifted to the gender-neutral title of 'royal' in lieu of 'king' and 'queen'.

Academic activity pauses weekly on Wednesdays from 1:00 to 2:30 p.m. in a period known as "Campus Life Time", which was established in February 1991. During Campus Life Time, no classes are scheduled and events take place at the Academic Mall, allowing students to take a break from their studies and come together for social activity.

First-year students are assigned a book written by a notable figure, who speaks to the entire freshman class on Commons Day in the fall semester. Commons Day speakers have included Supreme Court associate justice Sonia Sotomayor, author Janet Mock, designer Joshua Davis and journalist Charles M. Blow.

The Festival of Lights started in 2000 as an annual Stony Brook tradition that celebrates the numerous cultures and faiths which celebrate during the holiday season. The festival is preceded by "Light the Brook", a tree lighting ceremony at the Academic Mall. Midnight Breakfast takes place during the first Monday of Finals Week in both semesters as the dining halls open late to serve breakfast foods to students.

To celebrate Earth Day, Stony Brook holds a week-long Earthstock celebration in the week leading up, culminating in the Earthstock Festival. Numerous environment-themed events take place throughout the week, with the most known tradition being the Rubber Duck Race held at "The Brook" adjacent to the Administration building.

Starting in 1993, Strawberry Fest is held on the first Wednesday of May, where students and faculty gather at the Academic Mall to eat an array of strawberry-themed foods with live music and student performances. In 1998, Stony Brook began to hold Diversity Day during the same day as Strawberry Fest, planned and organized by the Office of Multicultural Affairs to highlight the diverse cultures which make up the university.

The yearly Roth Pond Regatta, held since 1989, attracts dozens of competitors and thousands of attendees, including students, faculty, staff, and alumni. The competition involves groups making boats out of cardboard and tape, with the challenge to get across the Roth Pond first without sinking.

Stony Brook holds two annual concerts – Back to the Brook during the fall semester and Brookfest during the spring semester. The inaugural Back to the Brook took place in 2012 and featured Reel Big Fish at the Staller Steps. Since then, Mac Miller, Lupe Fiasco, Walk the Moon, Fetty Wap and Post Malone have headlined Back to the Brook. 2018's Back to the Brook was infamously cancelled after only 24 tickets were sold for headliner Ashanti a week before the concert. 2019's Back to the Brook was controversially cancelled again. The historic Stony Brook concert series was revived in 2011 with Brookfest hosting headliners Bruno Mars and Janelle Monáe. Brookfest has since been headlined by Wiz Khalifa and Miguel, Ludacris and Grouplove, Childish Gambino and Diplo, Panic! at the Disco and Twenty One Pilots, Future and Cash Cash, DNCE and Joey Badass, 21 Savage and A Boogie wit da Hoodie, and ASAP Ferg and Aminé.

In the early 2010s, Stony Brook's Graduate Student Organization sponsored a concert series on the first Thursday of every month titled Stony Brooklyn, focused on exposing the student body to up-and-coming indie rock musicians from the New York area. This concert series included acts like The Antlers, Parquet Courts, Beach Fossils, The Drums, Ra Ra Riot, Das Racist and The Front Bottoms playing concerts on the Stony Brook campus. As interest in this scene declined, the series was shut down by 2017.

The Spirit of Stony Brook Marching Band
The Spirit of Stony Brook Marching Band was created in 2006 by Jerrold Stein, the Dean of Students at the time, and plays at athletic games and other events. The first public performance was at the September 2006 convocation. The band grew to 70 members the second year and added additional staff. The band first traveled to the America East men's basketball tournament in March 2007 and has done so regularly ever since. By July 2008, the band had reached 100 members, and by the mid-2010s had attracted over 200 members.

The Stony Brook marching band first participated in the NYC Columbus Day Parade in 2011, as well as appeared in an episode of Extreme Makeover: Home Edition and a commercial for the New York Lottery. The band performed on ESPN's College GameDay in 2017 when an episode was hosted in New York City's Times Square.

In 2021 during the COVID-19 pandemic, members of the Stony Brook marching band performed in the virtual halftime show for the College Football Playoff National Championship game between Alabama and Ohio State.

Stony Brook's current Director of Athletic Bands is Justin R. Stolarik, who previously was a director at the University of Wisconsin–Madison and the University of Oklahoma.

Athletics

Stony Brook University's intercollegiate athletics teams, known as the Stony Brook Seawolves, compete in the National Collegiate Athletic Association (NCAA) at the Division I level and are members of the Colonial Athletic Association, beginning on July 1, 2022. The school's current Director of Athletics is Shawn Heilbron, who was hired in May 2014 after serving as Senior Associate Athletic Director for Development at Oregon State University.

The university's athletics teams were originally known as the Soundmen or the Baymen in the early 1950s when the campus was located in Oyster Bay. Their name was changed to the Warriors in 1960, and again to the Patriots and Lady Patriots in 1966. In 1994, as Stony Brook prepared to become a Division I program, the team nickname was changed again, this time to its current day incarnation, the Seawolves. The team's mascot is named Wolfie.

Beginning in 2019, Stony Brook announced a partnership with SNY to broadcast football, basketball and lacrosse games on the channel. Stony Brook games on WUSB were announced by Josh Caray, grandson of famed broadcaster Harry Caray and son of Skip Caray until his departure in 2019.

The Stony Brook Patriots participated at the Division III level until 1995, when they moved up to Division II with the ultimate goal of soon reaching Division I. On June 3, 1997, President Shirley Kenny announced that the Seawolves' entire athletics program would play at the Division I level beginning during the 1999–00 season. Stony Brook joined the America East Conference in 2001 until leaving in 2022 and also played women's tennis in the Missouri Valley Conference.

Stony Brook garnered national attention during their 2012 College World Series run. The Seawolves upset the LSU Tigers in a three-game series to win the Baton Rouge Super Regional and reach the College World Series in Omaha, the first America East team to do so. Coach Matt Senk was awarded the National College Baseball Writers Association's Coach of the Year award. Outfielder Travis Jankowski was drafted by the San Diego Padres in the first round of the 2012 MLB Draft.

After going winless in four consecutive America East Finals in men's basketball, the Seawolves earned their first bid to the NCAA tournament in 2016 by defeating the Vermont Catamounts 80–74. They lost to Kentucky in the first round of the NCAA Tournament by a score of 85–57.

Stony Brook has established itself as a dominant force in women's lacrosse. Since 2013, the Seawolves have finished in first place in the America East for eight straight seasons, making eight consecutive NCAA Division I Women's Lacrosse Championship tournaments. During the 2018 season, the Seawolves were ranked No. 1 nationally in all three major polls (IWLCA Coaches' Poll, Cascade/Inside Lacrosse, Nike/US Lacrosse) for at least ten weeks.

In recent years, Stony Brook's athletic facilities have undergone several additions and renovations. The Goldstein Family Student-Athlete Development Center opened in 2006 after a million-dollar donation by alumnus Stuart Goldstein. In 2011, Joe Nathan Field, dedicated to six-time MLB All-Star relief pitcher and Stony Brook alumnus Joe Nathan, opened after renovations to the former University Field were made possible by Nathan's $500,000 donation. Island Federal Arena, formerly known as the Stony Brook University Arena, opened in 2014 after a two-year, $21.1 million renovation. The Pritchard Gymnasium, current home of the volleyball team and former home of the men's and women's basketball teams, underwent a $1.5 million renovation in 2008. Alumnus Glenn Dubin donated $4.3 million to a strength and conditioning facility named the Dubin Family Athletic Performance Center, which opened in 2012. The Dubin family also pledged $5 million for a $10 million for the Dubin Family Indoor Training Center, which opened in 2020.

Transportation 

In 2013, Stony Brook University launched its own bike share system to provide a sustainable transportation alternative for students (Wolf Ride Bike Share). As of 2016, the university provides 8 stations and 63 bikes. Docking stations and bikes are supplied by PBSC Urban Solutions.

There is also a system of buses operated by the university. This system is accessible to anyone on the Stony Brook Campus at no charge.

The university is located next to the Stony Brook LIRR station on the Port Jefferson Line.

The university is served by Suffolk County Transit connection S60/S69 and 3D is available on campus.

Notable people

Notable alumni 
 Chris Algieri, 2007, professional boxer and former WBO junior welterweight title holder
 Kim Barnes Arico, current head coach of the Michigan Wolverines women's basketball team (transferred)
 Joy Behar, 1966, co-host of The View
 Pat Benatar, musician, Rock and Roll Hall of Fame nominee (dropped out)
 Mark Bridges, 1983, Academy Award-winning costume designer
 Adrien Brody, youngest winner of the Academy Award for Best Actor for The Pianist (2002)
 Steve Cuozzo, 1971, journalist, contributor for the New York Post
 Dabuz, 2017, a professional Super Smash Bros. player
 Buck Dharma, lead guitarist and sole constant member of rock band Blue Öyster Cult
 Diane Farr, 1995, actress on Numbers and Rescue Me
 Lee A. Fleisher, M.D., Chief Medical Officer and Director of the Centers for Medicare & Medicaid Services Center for Clinical Standards and Quality.
 Keiko Fujimori, Peruvian politician
 Steven K. Galson, 1978, former acting Surgeon General of the United States
 David Gelernter, 1982, computer science professor at Yale and Unabomber victim
 Richard Gelfond, 1976, CEO of IMAX Corporation
 Victoria Hart, 2010, YouTube personality, educator, inventor
 Daria Hazuda, 1989, biochemist; discovered the first HIV Integrase Strand Transfer Inhibitors
 John L. Hennessy, 1975, tenth president of Stanford University, 2017 Turing Award winner
 Scott Higham, 1982, winner of 2002 Pulitzer Prize in investigative journalism
 Travis Jankowski, 2012, MLB player, first-round draft pick, currently with the New York Mets
 Tom Koehler, 2008, former MLB pitcher
 Risa Lavizzo-Mourey, first woman and first African-American president and CEO of the Robert Wood Johnson Foundation
 Kevin Kwan Loucks, 2013, CEO of Chamber Music America
 Steven Mackey, 1980, composer, electric guitarist, Professor of Composition at Princeton University
 Momina Mustehsan, a Pakistani singer, musician, and social activist.
Dianne Morales (born 1967), non-profit executive and political candidate
 Richie Narvaez, 1986, 1988, novelist
 Joe Nathan, 1997, six-time MLB All-Star and Minnesota Twins Hall of Famer
 Callistus Ndlovu, Zimbabwean politician
 Jon Oringer, 1997, founder and CEO of Shutterstock
 Vinay Pathak, Indian Actor
 Sandy Pearlman, 1966, music producer and band manager for Blue Öyster Cult, Black Sabbath, etc.
Nan Phinney, 1972, accelerator physicist at SLAC, program coordinator for the world's first linear collider
 Jef Raskin, 1964, Apple manager and creator of the Macintosh
 Dominick Reyes, 2013, mixed martial artist currently #7 in the UFC light heavyweight rankings
 Burton Rocks, 1994, sports attorney and current agent of Paul DeJong
 G. Samantha Rosenthal, 2015, historian, writer, and professor at Roanoke College
 Howard Saltz, 1983, as editor of the South Florida Sun-Sentinel in Fort Lauderdale won the Pulitzer Prize for Public Service in 2013
 Laura Schlessinger, 1968, talk radio host
 Andrew Sega, 1997, video game music composer
 Duane Silverstein, 1974, award-winning conservationist, executive director of Seacology
 Bettie M. Steinberg, 1976, Chief Scientific Officer for The Feinstein Institute for Medical Research
 Daniel Zamora, 2015, MLB pitcher, currently with the Seattle Mariners Organization

Faculty awards and honors

 Nobel Prize in Physics
 Nobel Prize in Medicine
 Nobel Peace Prize
 Nobel Memorial Prize in Economic Sciences
 Pulitzer Prize
 Crafoord Prize
 Wolf Prize
 Fields Medal
 Abel Prize
 National Medal of Science (5)
 National Medal of Technology (2)
 Presidential Early Career Award for Scientists and Engineers
 Benjamin Franklin Medal
 National Book Critics Circle Award
 Oliver E. Buckley Condensed Matter Prize
 Grammy Award
 NASA Distinguished Service Medal
 Obie Award
 Howard Hughes Medical Institute Award
 Humboldt Research Award for Senior U.S. Scientists

Fellows of Academic Societies

 Fellows of the Royal Society (6)
 MacArthur Foundation Fellows (3)
 National Academy of Engineering Fellows (3)
 National Academy of Sciences Fellows (19)
 American Academy of Arts and Sciences Fellows (19)
 Guggenheim Fellows (87)
 Fulbright Association Fellows (54)
 Sloan Foundation Fellows (46)
 Rockefeller Foundation Fellows (13)
 Institute of Medicine Members (3)

Notes

References

External links 

 

 
Flagship universities in the United States